The ZG 1229 Vampir 1229 (ZG 1229), also known by its code name Vampir, was an active infrared device developed for the Wehrmacht for the Sturmgewehr 44 assault rifle during World War II, intended primarily for night use. Designed by C.G. Haenel, the Vampir was used in small numbers in the Eastern Front.

The system was heavy, with the device itself and a bulky battery backpack weighing  in total. The grenadier carrying this was known as a Nachtjäger (night-hunter).

Design
As well as the sight and infrared spotlight, there was a wooden-cased battery for the light weighing , and a second battery fitted inside a gas mask container to power the image converter. This was all strapped to a Tragegestell 39 (pack frame 1939). The searchlight consisted of a conventional tungsten light source shining through a filter permitting only infrared light. The sensor operated in the near-infrared (light) spectrum rather than in the thermal infrared (heat) spectrum and was, therefore, not sensitive to body heat.

Use
Vampir gear was first used in combat in February 1945. However, introduction of infrared devices for small arms began in early 1944. 310 units were delivered to the Wehrmacht at the final stages of the war. Eastern Front veteran reports consist of snipers shooting at night with the aid of 'peculiar non-shining flashlights coupled with enormous optical sights' mounted on their rifles. Similar infrared gear was fitted both to MG 34 and MG 42 machine guns.

References

 German Infrared Night-Vision Devices achtungpanzer.com

World War II German electronics
Research and development in Nazi Germany
Firearm sights
Infrared imaging
Night vision devices